OCAD can refer to:

Ontario College of Art & Design in Toronto, Ontario, Canada
OCAD, software for drawing maps;  see Orienteering map
Oklahoma City Air Depot;  see Tinker Air Force Base
Ontario College Advanced Diploma
OCAD